Bizimkiler (Ours, Our People) was a Turkish drama, represented the lives of the people who shared the same neighborhood.   It is also the name of musical project run by ANS TV.

The show is development of the movie Kapıcılar Kralı for which Umur Bugay who is the creator of the tv series, was the screenwriter.

It is one of the longest-running series in Turkish television drama history.

Due to lack of variety of television stations when series was first broadcast, the show attracted most of the audiences in Turkey and had huge cultural impact.

Production

Yalcın Yelence has directed all of the episodes, besides the last 6 ones. Producer Umur Bugay was also the screenwriter for all episodes, later assisted by Sulhi Dölek

Series have been shot in Kadıköy, a district in Anatolian Side of Istanbul

Broadcast history

Series have been broadcast on Sunday prime time in TRT 1 between 1987-1994, in Star TV between 1994-1999 and in Show TV between 1999-2002.

Re-run of the series have been broadcast irregularly both in various national and local television stations.

Main cast

 Erdal Özyağcılar (1989-1997), Savaş Dinçel (1997-2002) as Şükrü Başaran
 Cihat Tamer (1989-1991), Engin Şenkan (1991-2002) as Şevket Başaran
 Ayşe Kökçü as Nazan Başaran 
 Bensu Orhunöz as Bilge Başaran 
 Atılay Uluışık as Ali Başaran 
 Mehmet Akan as Sabri Dönmez
 Ercan Yazgan as Cafer Haktanır "Doorman"
 Salih Kalyon as Sedat "Knock Knock""
 Aykut Oray as Yavuz Korkmaz "Thug"
 Uğurtan Sayıner as Cemil "Drunk"
 Oktay Sözbir as Halil Arslan "Halil Marketing"
 Selçuk Uluergüven as Davut Öztürk 
 Ali Uyandıran as Halis Öztürk "Dummkopf"
 Savaş Yurttaş as Yengeç Hüseyin

References

Turkish drama television series
1990s Turkish television series
2000s Turkish television series
1989 Turkish television series debuts
2002 Turkish television series endings
Turkish television series endings
Television shows set in Istanbul
Television series produced in Istanbul